Activity-dependent neuroprotector homeobox is a protein that in humans is encoded by the ADNP gene.

Function

Vasoactive intestinal peptide is a neuroprotective factor that has a stimulatory effect on the growth of some tumor cells and an inhibitory effect on others. This gene encodes a protein that is upregulated by vasoactive intestinal peptide and may be involved in its stimulatory effect on certain tumor cells. The encoded protein contains one homeobox and nine zinc finger domains, suggesting that it functions as a transcription factor. This gene is also upregulated in normal proliferative tissues. Finally, the encoded protein may increase the viability of certain cell types through modulation of p53 activity. Alternatively spliced transcript variants encoding the same protein have been described.

Clinical significance 
Mutations in ADNP cause the Helsmoortel-Van der Aa syndrome.

References

External links

Further reading